United States gubernatorial elections were held on Tuesday November 8, in 35 states. 12 governors Democrats and 23 governors Republicans won election, bringing the partisan reflection of the nation's states to 25 Democrats and 25 Republicans. This election coincided with the Senate and the House elections.

Alabama 

Until 1968, Alabama governors were not allowed two successive terms. To circumvent this, Wallace used his wife Lurleen as his stand-in. She died in 1968.

Alaska 

Egan was defeated in 1966, but would be re-elected in 1970 (see 1970 United States gubernatorial elections).

Arizona 

Arizona operated on governors serving two-year terms until 1970, when Jack Richard Williams was the first governor to be elected to a four-year term. He had previously been elected governor for two two-year terms in 1966. and in 1968.  Arizona made the switch official from two-year to four-year terms in 1968 with an amendment.

Arizona not only adopted a four-year term for governors starting in the general election of 1970, but also  adopted a two consecutive term limit in 1992.

Arkansas 

Arkansas had two-year terms for governors until 1984, when they switched to four-year terms with Amendment 63.

Winthrop Rockefeller was elected the first Republican governor since Reconstruction. He became the first Republican governor of any former Confederate State since Alfred A. Taylor  of Tennessee was defeated in 1922.

California 

Incumbent governor Pat Brown (Democrat) was defeated in his bid for a third term by future U.S. president Ronald Reagan (Republican).

Florida 

William Haydon Burns was elected in 1964 for a two-year term because Florida shifted their governors' races from presidential years to midterm years. Starting in 1966, Florida held their four-year gubernatorial races in midterm years.

Kirk was the first Republican governor in the 20th century.

In 1968, Florida adopted a new state constitution, and the governor now had the option to serve two four-year terms in a row.

Georgia 

Maddox was elected by the State Legislature, and Callaway was the first Republican nominee for governor since 1876.

Oklahoma 

During Henry Bellmon's first term (1963–1967), the Oklahoma Constitution was changed to allow its governor to serve consecutive terms. However,  the rule change did not apply to Bellmon.  Thus, he was not eligible to serve a second term. He later served another term, from 1987 to 1991.

United States 1966 governors' races chart

See also
1966 United States elections
1966 United States Senate elections
1966 United States House of Representatives elections

References

 
November 1966 events in the United States